Nicole Sewell (born 1981) is a former professional tennis player from Australia.

Biography
A right-handed player from Perth, Sewell was most prominent on the doubles circuit, with 11 ITF titles and a best ranking of 107 in the world. She made most of her Grand Slam and WTA Tour main-draw appearances partnering Casey Dellacqua.

She is the daughter of former East Fremantle and Footscray footballer Jim Sewell.

ITF finals

Singles (1–1)

Doubles (11–12)

References

External links
 
 

1981 births
Living people
Australian female tennis players
Tennis players from Perth, Western Australia